This is the discography documenting albums and singles released by American R&B/soul singer Freddie Jackson.

Albums

Studio albums

Compilation and live albums

Singles

References

Discographies of American artists
Rhythm and blues discographies